McMurdo is a surname, as well as a name given to many places in Antarctica, including:

Places in Antarctica
McMurdo Station, a station at the southern tip of Ross Island in Antarctica
South Pole Traverse, also known as the McMurdo – South Pole highway
McMurdo Sound, a sound lying at the junction of the Ross Sea
McMurdo Ice Shelf, a portion of the Ross Ice Shelf
McMurdo Dry Valleys, a row of valleys in Victoria Land

Surname
Alex McMurdo, Scottish footballer
Archibald McMurdo (1812–1894), British naval officer, has many places in Antarctica named after him
Margaret McMurdo (born 1954), Australian judge
Wendy McMurdo (born 1962), British artist

Other uses
 McMurdo (crater), a crater in the Mare Australe quadrangle of Mars